Bandar-e Shah Rokhi (also Romanized as Bandar-e Shāh Rokhī) is a village in Sarduiyeh Rural District, Sarduiyeh District, Jiroft County, Kerman Province, Iran. At the 2006 census, its population was 42, in 7 families.

References 

Populated places in Jiroft County